Wyman P. Meinzer is a photographer from Benjamin, Texas. In a review of 'Texas Lost', The Dallas Morning News said Meinzer "just might be the best nature photographer in Texas. He has had more than 250 magazine cover photos published. He also has 17 photography books published. George W. Bush named him state photographer of Texas in 1997. As of 1997, Meinzer taught photography at Texas Tech and hunted coyotes and bobcats in the winter months. Meizner's photos illustrate Texas Past: Enduring Legacy (Texas Parks and Wildlife Press) written by Andrew Sansom.

Selected bibliography
6666: Portrait of a Texas Ranch 
Texas Rivers 
Canyons of the Texas High Plains
Between Heaven and Texas
Between Heaven and Texas 
Coyotes in the Rolling Plains of Texas
Photographing Coyotes (1995)
The Coyote in Southwestern Folklore

Other work

Meinzer, Wyman (1993). "Beep! Beep! Better pull over, folks – it's the roadrunner". Smithsonian 23: 58.

Graves, John; Wyman Meinzer (2002). Texas Rivers. University of Texas Press. p. 79. .

References

Further viewing
Wyman Meinzer; Texas State Photographer

American photographers
Living people
Year of birth missing (living people)